Boxing at the 2004 Summer Olympics took place in the Peristeri Olympic Boxing Hall. The event was only open to men and bouts were contested over four rounds of two minutes each. Five judges scored the fighters in real time and the boxer with the most points at the end was the winner.

Three days before the Games opening ceremony the International Olympic Committee announced that Kenyan boxer David Munyasia had tested positive for cathine and has been excluded from the event.

Several medalists at the 2004 Olympics, including Amir Khan, Andre Ward, Gennady Golovkin, Yuriorkis Gamboa, and Guillermo Rigondeaux, later went on to become world champions in professional boxing. However, Russian boxers don’t typically turn pro as their government provides them with extensive funding which allows them to keep their “amateur” status and compete at multiple Olympics. The tournament was also Mario Kindelán's final Olympic event before retirement, with a second lightweight gold metal after beating Amir Khan.

Test event
The pre-olympic test event, better known as the 25th Acropolis Cup, was held from 26 to 30 May 2004 in the Peristeri Olympic Boxing Hall in Athens, Greece.

Qualification
The following tournaments were used as qualification tournaments for boxing at the 2004 Summer Olympics.

Africa
 All-Africa Games in Abuja, Nigeria from 4 to 20 October 2003 
 Qualification Tournament in Casablanca, Morocco from 15 to 22 January 2004
 Qualification Tournament in Gaborone, Botswana from 15 to 22 March 2004

North and South America
 Pan American Games in Santo Domingo, Dominican Republic from 1 to 17 August 2003 
 Qualification Tournament in Tijuana, Mexico from 12 to 20 March 2004
 Qualification Tournament in Rio de Janeiro, Brasil from 4 to 11 April 2004

Asia
 Asian Championships in Puerto Princesa, Philippines from 11 to 18 January 2004 
 Qualification Tournament in Guangzhou, China from 18 to 26 March 2004
 Qualification Tournament in Karachi, Pakistan from 5 to 12 May 2004

Europe
 European Championships in Pula, Croatia from 19 to 29 February 2004
 Qualification Tournament in Plovdiv, Bulgaria from 29 March to 5 April 2004
 Qualification Tournament in Warsaw, Poland from 29 March to 5 April 2004
 Qualification Tournament in Gothenburg, Sweden from 20 to 25 April 2004
 Qualification Tournament in Baku, Azerbaijan from 27 April to 1 May 2004

Australia and Oceania
 Qualification Tournament in Tonga from 26 April to 2 May 2004

Medal summary

Medal table

References

External links
Official result book – Boxing

 
2004
Olympics
2004 Summer Olympics events